Alastor arabicus is a species of wasp in the family Vespidae.

References

arabicus
Insects described in 1979